An Evening with the Allman Brothers Band: 2nd Set is a live album by the American rock group the Allman Brothers Band.  It was recorded in 1992 and 1994, and released in 1995. The recording of "In Memory of Elizabeth Reed" was nominated for a Grammy Award for Best Pop Instrumental Performance at the 38th Annual Grammy Awards, but it lost to "Mariachi Suite" by Los Lobos. The recording of "Jessica" included on the album won a Grammy Award for Best Rock Instrumental Performance at the 38th Annual Grammy Awards in 1996.

Track listing
"Sailin' 'Cross the Devil's Sea" (Gregg Allman, Warren Haynes, Allen Woody, Jack Pearson) – 4:49
"You Don't Love Me" (Willie Cobbs) – 6:36
"Soulshine" (Warren Haynes) – 6:42
"Back Where It All Begins" (Dickey Betts) – 12:32
"In Memory of Elizabeth Reed" (Dickey Betts) – 10:15
"The Same Thing" (Willie Dixon) – 8:22
"No One to Run With" (Dickey Betts, John Prestia) – 6:29
"Jessica" (Dickey Betts) – 16:09

Tracks 1, 3, 4, 6, 7 Recorded at Garden State Arts Center Holmdel, NJ on August 16, 1994
Tracks 2 and 8 Recorded at Walnut Creek Amphitheatre in Raleigh, NC on July 1, 1994
Track 5 Recorded at R&R Club in Los Angeles, CA on June 11, 1992

Personnel

The Allman Brothers Band
Gregg Allman – Hammond B-3 organ, acoustic guitar, lead vocals
Dickey Betts – lead and rhythm guitar, acoustic guitar, lead vocals
Jaimoe – drums, percussion on "The Same Thing", background vocals
Butch Trucks – drums, tympani, background vocals
Warren Haynes – lead, rhythm, and slide guitar, acoustic guitar, lead and background vocals
Allen Woody – bass, fretless bass, 6 string bass, acoustic bass, background vocals
Marc Quinones – congas, percussion, drums on "The Same Thing"

Additional musicians
Paul T. Riddle – drums on "Jessica", "You Don't Love Me"

Production
Produced by: Tom Dowd
Mixed by: Jay Mark
Second engineer: Steve Robillard
Live recordings by: David Hewitt, Biff Dawes, Bud Snyder, John Falzarano
Mastered by: Vlado Meller
Digital editing engineer: Charles Dye

See also
An Evening with the Allman Brothers Band: First Set

References

Albums produced by Tom Dowd
1995 live albums
Epic Records live albums
The Allman Brothers Band live albums
Grammy Award for Best Rock Instrumental Performance